Banchhada (or Banchada) is a tribe in central India that is traditionally identified with prostitution and other crimes. They are listed as a Scheduled Caste for the purposes of India's reservation system and were formerly classified as a criminal tribe in the British Raj era.

The Banchhada are located in the states of Madhya Pradesh and Rajasthan.

References

Ethnic groups in India
Scheduled Castes of Madhya Pradesh
Denotified tribes of India
Scheduled Castes of Rajasthan
Prostitution in India